Donghwasa, also Donghwa Temple, is a Buddhist temple of the Jogye Order in northern Daegu, South Korea.  The temple is located on the south side of Mt. Palgongsan, within the boundaries of Dohak-dong, Dong-gu, near Daegu's northern border. The name means "Temple of Paulownia Blossoms."

History 
Donghwasa Temple (Korean: 桐華寺; 동화사) was originally established as Yugasa Temple in 493 by Ven. Geukdal. According to the Donghwasa Temple Record Monument, erected in 1931, it was renamed by Patriarch Ven. Simji in 832. The name “Donghwa (桐華; literally ‘Korean paulownia flower’)” came from a legend that the Korean paulownia bloomed even in winter at that time so people regarded it as an auspicious sign.

According to the Samgungnyusa, Vinaya Master Jinpyo gave some bones with sutras engraved on them  to Ven. Yeongsim,  who later gave them to Patriarch Simji.  In trying to decide where to enshrine these bones, Patriarch Ven. Simji climbed a mountaintop, along with the two gods of Mt. Jungak, one of Silla's five sacred mountains, and threw them toward the west. The bones blew away in the wind and landed in a small well north of what is now Donghwasa Temple's Chamdang Hall. He constructed a lecture hall there and enshrined the bones within it, thereby establishing Donghwasa Temple.

In 863, the three-story stone pagoda at Biroam Hermitage of Donghwasa Temple and the stone Vairocana Buddha were built by a decree of King Gyeongmun. Thus we know that the temple was already established there by the late 9th century.

When Later Baekje attacked Silla, the 10,000 Goryeo soldiers, led by Wang Geon who responded to Silla's call for help, stayed at Donghwasa Temple and fought Later Baekje troops. However, Goryeo suffered a crushing defeat.

In 1036, by royal decree of Goryeo's King Jeongjong, the temple was chosen for testing monks on sutras and Vinaya, along with Yeongtongsa Temple and Sungbeopsa Temple in Gaegyeong and Bu-insa Temple in Daegu. In 1190, National Preceptor Ven. Bojo  stayed at Donghwasa Temple and oversaw a massive reconstruction. In 1298, in honor of the dying wish of National Preceptor Ven. Hongjin,  the temple was reconstructed again.

The temple was also reconstructed several times during the Joseon era; in 1606 Great Master Samyeong repaired the damage inflicted during the Japanese invasion, and again in 1677 and 1732 by monks like Sangsung, Gwanheo and Nakbin. Many of Donghwasa Temple's major Dharma halls, including the Main Buddha Hall, were constructed at these times. During the Japanese invasion (1592-1597), Great Master Samyeong resided at the temple and commanded a monk militia.

The region on Mt. Palgongsan where Donghwasa Temple is located was previously the site of Seungsi (a traditional monastic market),  at which temples on nearby mountains bartered daily necessities. This traditional market was held from the Goryeo to the early Joseon era. The temple recently revived this tradition, and every October holds a “Seungsi Festival” which lasts one week.

Christian fundamentalist desecration
In 1998, a Christian destroyed about seven-hundred and fifty Buddhist statues to change the Buddhist temple into a Christian church.

Cultural properties  
Donghwasa Temple owns 14 items of state-designated cultural objects, 11 items of tangible cultural heritage designated by Daegu City, and 8 items of cultural heritage materials.

Tourism 
It also offers temple stay programs where visitors can experience Buddhist culture.

See also

Jogye Order
Buddhist temples in South Korea
Korean Buddhism

References

External links
Official site, in Korean
Oriental Architecture profile

493 establishments
Buddhist temples in South Korea
Buddhist temples of the Jogye Order
Buildings and structures in Daegu
Tourist attractions in Daegu
Dong District, Daegu
5th-century establishments in Korea
5th-century Buddhist temples